Dahr-al-Ain    is a village in the Koura District of Lebanon, with a  Maronite and  Greek Orthodox population.

It attracted media attention in May 2010 when two brothers, Tony and Nayef Saleh, were shot by Hanna al-Bersawi on May 28, apparently for political reasons only days before the municipal polls.

Dahr Al-Ain is currently Annexed by Ras Maska.

References  

Eastern Orthodox Christian communities in Lebanon
Maronite Christian communities in Lebanon
Sunni Muslim communities in Lebanon
Populated places in the North Governorate
Koura District